Fred Warren "Lefty" Stiely (June 1, 1901 – January 6, 1981) was a Major League Baseball pitcher who played for the St. Louis Browns from  to .

External links

 

1901 births
1981 deaths
Baseball players from Pennsylvania
Major League Baseball pitchers
St. Louis Browns players